New Arrival is the fourth and final studio album by the A-Teens, released in 2003. The album consists of six songs previously released on Pop 'til You Drop! along with six new previously unreleased songs. The album title is a reference and dedication to ABBA's 1976 fourth studio album, Arrival.

Background

Marie said, "We wanted to present a totally new album for the European market, because some of our hard core fans already imported Pop 'til You Drop!, so we wanted to give them something new". Some special editions include the bonus tracks "Can't Help Falling in Love" (also included in Pop 'til You Drop! and on the Disney's Lilo & Stitch's soundtrack), the ballad version of "Heartbreak Lullaby". The Japanese edition of the album includes the Pop 'til You Drop! song "Hi and Goodbye". 

The album features a number of cover songs. Notably, Murray Head's "One Night in Bangkok" was recorded, originally composed by ABBA members Benny Andersson and Björn Ulvaeus along with Tim Rice. Other covers featured on the album are Shirley & Company's "Shame, Shame, Shame" and The Box Tops' "The Letter".

The A-Teens were involved in the writing of this album and participated in designing the artwork. The first single "Floorfiller" was released in October 2002 in Europe.the album was released in Sweden on January 28 2003 and reached number four on the albums chart. The album was released in some Latin American countries on March 17, 2003, reaching number seven on the Mexican International Albums Chart after a few weeks inside the top 10. The album was released in the summer of 2003 in Germany with minimal success.

Track listing

Tracks 1, 4, 7–10, 13 previously released on Pop 'Til You Drop! (2002).
Track 9 has an alternative ending from the previous release on Pop 'Til You Drop! (2002).
 Track 14 previously released on Heartbreak Lullaby (Maxi Single) (2001).

Track 15  previously released on Pop 'Til You Drop! (2002).

Weekly charts

References

A-Teens albums
2003 albums
Stockholm Records albums
Albums recorded at Polar Studios